Rock the Casbah (Hebrew: רוק בקסבה) is a 2012 Israeli drama film.

Title
The title is drawn from a punk rock song, "Rock the Casbah", that was wildly popular among young Israelis at the time.

Synopsis
A unit of new recruits sent to patrol Gaza during the First Intifada in 1989.  A washing machine is deliberately  pushed from the roof of a building as the patrol moves past, killing one of the soldiers.  The perpetrator cannot be found. Four of the young soldiers are assigned to uncomfortable, boring, surveillance duty atop the roof, interacting with the Arab family that lives in the building. 

There is a dual focus lives in fear of being accused of collaborating with the Israeli soldiers, and on the young soldiers: sensitive, clean-cut Tomer (Yon Tumarkin);  Haim (Iftach Rave) whose crude complaining about the food and his intestinal distress gives the film some laughs; feisty, hotheaded Aki (Roy Nik) who challenges the group's leader, marijuana-smoking  Ariel (Yotam Ishay), who will muster out of his mandatory army service if he survives the next few weeks.

Cast
Yon Tumarkin as Tomer
Yotam Ishay as Ariel
Roy Nik as Aki
Iftach Rave as Haim
Henry David as Ilya
Lavi Zitner as Izac
Shmulik Chelben as Israel
Khaula Al Haji-Daibsi as Samira
Adel Abou Raya as Muchamad
Or Ben-Melech
Angel Bonanni
Abdallah El Akal
Vladimir Freedman
Ofer Ruthenberg

Critical reception
Rock the Casbah won the Berlin International Film Festival's C.I.C.A.E. award in 2013.

Jordan Hoffman of Film.com called the film "worth seeing and discussing" and gave it 7.3 out of 10, noting that it "succinctly expresses just how difficult and intractable the [Israeli–Palestinian conflict] is", and that "it is essential to encourage films that do not demonize the individuals on either side of the conflict." Another reviewer rated the film 4 stars out of 5 and remarked that it is "thoughtful in its representation of thoughtlessness, and curiously poetic". However, Dan Fainaru of Screen Daily argued that the film "attempts to offer an even-handed portrait of their confrontation with the Arab population, but ends up as an impressionistic report rather than a full scale dramatic experience", and Alissa Simon of Variety added that "the script fails to offer something viewers haven’t seen before."

References

External links
 

2012 films
Israeli–Palestinian conflict films
Films about the Israel Defense Forces
Films set in the Gaza Strip
Israeli drama films
Films set in 1989